Juan Garland, born as John Garland, (Ireland - † Schooner Marina, Caribbean Sea, December 1775) was an Irish military engineer who served the Spanish Empire, and who directed many of the largest public works made in Colonial Chile.

Among his works is the modification of the Valdivian Fort System; the floor plan of the Cabildo of Santiago; the selection of site and urban design of the new Concepción which was moved in 1765 following the tsunami of 1751; the main church of Valdivia (destroyed later by the 1960 Valdivia earthquake); the makeover of dikes of Mapocho River (1765), the direction of the improvement of the Santiago–Mendoza road, plus some contributions on the design of Puente de Calicanto.

References

Garland, John
Irish military engineers
Irish soldiers in the Spanish Army
18th-century Spanish military personnel
1775 deaths
Date of death missing
Expatriates in pre-independence Chile